Farm to Market Road 179 (FM 179) is a farm to market road in the U.S. state of Texas.

History
FM 179 was first designated on June 11, 1945 along a county road in Dawson County from Lamesa north . On September 29, 1948, another section of FM 179 from SH 137 at Welch southeast  to 1 mile north of Grandview school was created, creating a gap. On December 16, 1948, the 8-mile gap was closed. On March 24, 1953, FM 179 was rerouted north to FM 213, replacing part of FM 2053, with the old route west to Welch becoming part of FM 2053 instead. On January 8, 1960, FM 179 gained  when it was combined with FM 2081, extending the road to FM 1317. Previously, part of FM 594 was FM 1069 and part of FM 1073 was FM 1316. FM 179 reached its current length on September 19, 1968 when most of FM 1070 was combined with the highway.

Route description
FM 179 begins at an intersection with US 87 in northeastern Lamesa. The highway intersects with FM 2592 (North 22nd Street) before leaving the town and traveling through rural Dawson County. FM 179 runs through rural Lynn County and southern Lubbock County before entering the town of Wolfforth, intersecting with US 62/US 82. The highway leaves Wolfforth and runs through unincorporated Lubbock County before entering the city of Lubbock in the Hurlwood neighborhood. FM 179 leaves Lubbock and runs through an unincorporated area of the county before entering the town of Shallowater. The highway runs concurrently with US 84 before returning to a separate routing. FM 179 runs through rural western Hale County before ending at an intersection with SH 194 northwest of Plainview.

Junction list

References

0179
Transportation in Dawson County, Texas
Transportation in Lynn County, Texas
Transportation in Lubbock County, Texas
Transportation in Hale County, Texas